Acacia ephedroides is a tree belonging to the genus Acacia and the subgenus Juliflorae that is endemic to a reasonably large area in south western Australia.

Description
It has densely haired branchlets. Like most species of Acacia it has phyllodes rather than true leaves. The evergreen phyllodes have a filiform shape and are substraight to shallowly incurved and terete to compressed. It blooms from August to October producing yellow flowers.

Distribution
It is native to an area in the Peel and Wheatbelt regions of Western Australia where it is commonly situated amongst granite outcrops growing in sand, clay or clay-loam soils. It is found around the Jarrahdale in the west to around Manmanning to around Hyden in the east as apart of srubland or open woodland communities.

See also
List of Acacia species

References

ephedroides
Acacias of Western Australia
Taxa named by George Bentham
Plants described in 1842